This is a list of the National Register of Historic Places listings in Somervell County, Texas.

This is intended to be a complete list of properties and districts listed on the National Register of Historic Places in Somervell County, Texas. There are one district and three individual properties listed on the National Register in the county. Two individually listed properties, one of which is part of the district, are designated as both State Antiquities Landmarks and Recorded Texas Historic Landmarks. The district includes additional Recorded Texas Historic Landmarks.

Current listings

The locations of National Register properties and districts may be seen in a mapping service provided.

|}

See also

National Register of Historic Places listings in Texas
Recorded Texas Historic Landmarks in Somervell County

References

External links

Somervell County, Texas
Somervell County
Buildings and structures in Somervell County, Texas